Chestnut Hill is a neighborhood in the Northwest Philadelphia section of Philadelphia, Pennsylvania.  It is known for the high incomes of its residents and high real estate values, as well as its private schools.

Geography

Boundaries
Chestnut Hill is bounded as follows:
 on the northwest by Northwestern Avenue (a county line and city limit, beyond which lies a panhandle of Springfield Township, Montgomery County that juts into Whitemarsh Township);
 on the west by the Wissahickon Gorge (part of Fairmount Park) (beyond which lie Upper Roxborough and Andorra);
 on the northeast by Stenton Avenue (a county line and city limit, beyond which lie Erdenheim and Wyndmoor, both in Springfield Township); and
 on the southeast by the Cresheim Valley (part of Fairmount Park) (beyond which lies Mount Airy).

ZIP code
The USPS does not officially correlate neighborhood names to Philadelphia ZIP codes (all are called simply "Philadelphia" or "Phila"). However, the 19118 ZIP code is almost entirely coterminous with the cultural-consensus boundaries of Chestnut Hill.

History

The village of Chestnut Hill was part of the German Township laid out by Francis Daniel Pastorius and came to include the settlements originally known as Sommerhausen and Crefeld, as well as part of Cresheim.  It served as a gateway between Philadelphia and the nearby farmlands. During the American Revolutionary War era (late 18th century), the area was one of many summer vacation spots due to its higher elevation, 400–500 feet (120 to 150 m) above sea level, and cooler temperatures than the historic Center City. Chestnut Hill is still stereotypically known as one of the more affluent sections of Philadelphia. However, there are many residents who fall within lower/middle class incomes.

Chestnut Hill (along with many other towns and farmlands of Philadelphia County) became part of the City of Philadelphia in 1854 as part of the Act of Consolidation, when the County and the City became completely coterminous. In the same year, the Chestnut Hill Railroad (Chestnut Hill East Line) opened, making an easy commute to and from Center City.  In 1884, a second railway line was added by the Philadelphia, Germantown and Chestnut Hill Railroad (Connecting Railway).

During the American Civil War, Chestnut Hill was home to Mower U.S. Army General Hospital, constructed to serve Union army soldiers.

From the mid-19th century through the mid-20th, the neighborhood served as both a "railroad suburb" and a "streetcar suburb" of Center City; although it was part of Philadelphia, it was a leafy outlying part functioning as a bedroom community. The neighborhood contains a wide variety of 19th and early 20th century residential buildings by many of the most prominent Philadelphia architects.

In 1985, the neighborhood was designated as the Chestnut Hill Historic District (Philadelphia, Pennsylvania) with the National Register of Historic Places.  Citing its natural resources, architectural character, and thoughtful planning, the American Planning Association has recognized it among its Great Places in America.

Historic and notable architecture 

The Chestnut Hill listings on the National Register of Historic Places:
 Anglecot (1883), designed by Wilson Eyre.
 Chestnut Hill Historic District
 Druim Moir Historic District, includes Romanesque Revival mansion (1883–86), designed by G. W. & W. D. Hewitt. 
 Graver's Lane Station (1883), designed by Frank Furness.
 John Story Jenks School (1922), designed by Irwin T. Catharine.
 Thomas Mill Bridge (across the Wissahickon Creek, the only traditional covered bridge in Philadelphia).
 Wissahickon Inn (now Chestnut Hill Academy) (1883–84), designed by G. W. & W. D. Hewitt.

Other historic and notable properties include:
 High Hollow, The George Howe House (1914–17), designed by George Howe
 Inglewood Cottage (1850), designed by Thomas Ustick Walter.
 Esherick House (1961), designed by Louis Kahn.
 Vanna Venturi House (1962–64), designed by Robert Venturi.

Public transportation
Public transportation in southeastern Pennsylvania, which includes Philadelphia and the surrounding counties, is provided by SEPTA, the region's mass transit authority.

Regional rail (commuter rail)

Two SEPTA Regional Rail commuter train lines serve Chestnut Hill: the Chestnut Hill East Line and Chestnut Hill West Line.

Buses
Chestnut Hill is served by SEPTA bus routes from both the City Transit Division (23, 77 and L) and the Suburban Division (94 and 97).

Trolleys
Trams in the southeastern Pennsylvania region are known as trolleys. The trolley network of this region was very extensive prior to World War II, but has shrunk since that era. Chestnut Hill was formerly served by trolleys. Trolley service to Chestnut Hill began in 1894, and trolley tracks still run down the Belgian-block-paved main street of the neighborhood, Germantown Avenue, which was served by SEPTA Route 23. SEPTA "temporarily suspended" regular trolley service in 1992. From 1992 until 1996, weekend-only service ran between Chestnut Hill and Mount Airy, re-branded The "Chestnut Hill Trolley." Sporadic trolley charter trips ran down Germantown Avenue and into North Philadelphia until 2003.  In 2010, the Pennsylvania Department of Transportation completed work on restoring segments of the trolley infrastructure and streetscape in Chestnut Hill, Mount Airy and Germantown. As of 2011, SEPTA spokespeople publicly state that there are no plans to reinstate trolley service on Route 23, despite claims to the contrary in their annual capital budget reports. The dismantling of Route 23 infrastructure is unpopular with a large segment of local residents.

Education

Colleges and universities
 Chestnut Hill College

Primary and secondary schools

Public education

Residents are zoned to schools in the School District of Philadelphia. Students in grades kindergarten through 8 are zoned to John Story Jenks School, while students in grades 9 through 12 are zoned to Roxborough High School. Students were previously zoned to Germantown High School.

Private education
Chestnut Hill is home to several private schools. The Pre-K-12 Springside Chestnut Hill Academy, educates single-sex Pre-K-8 and coed 9–12, formed in 2010 through the merger of Springside School and Chestnut Hill Academy. Other private schools in Chestnut Hill are The Crefeld School (7-12), the K-8 Norwood-Fontbonne Academy, and Our Mother of Consolation. Nearby private schools in adjacent neighborhoods that attract some Chestnut Hill residents include Germantown Friends School, William Penn Charter School, and Germantown Academy.

Public libraries

Free Library of Philadelphia operates the Chestnut Hill Branch at 8711 Germantown Avenue.

Parks, arboretums, and recreation
 Pastorius Park
Wissahickon Valley Park of the Fairmount Park system
 Morris Arboretum of the University of Pennsylvania

The community previously held the Chestnut Hill Harry Potter Festival, but in 2018 the event was canceled since the copyright owners cracked down on for-profit uses of the brand. In 2017 there were 50,000 attendees to that year's 7th annual event.  In 2019, the festival resumed as the Witches & Wizards Festival.

Other notable civic institutions

 Philadelphia Cricket Club
 Wissahickon Skating Club
 Woodmere Art Museum

Notable people 
 R. Tucker Abbott, malacologist and author
 Willie Anderson, golfer, winner of four U.S. Opens
 E. Digby Baltzell, author and sociologist
 Maud Banks, tennis player
 Francis Bohlen (1868–1942), Algernon Sydney Biddle professor of law at the University of Pennsylvania Law School
 James Bond, ornithologist; namesake of Ian Fleming's fictional secret agent
 Adolph E. Borie merchant, civil war financier, Secretary of the Navy
 Joseph S. Clark, former U.S. senator from Pennsylvania and former mayor of Philadelphia
 Joe Daley, professional golfer
 Richardson Dilworth, former mayor of Philadelphia
 George Gordon Meade Easby, great-grandson of General George Meade
 Philo Taylor Farnsworth, (August 19, 1906 – March 11, 1971) was an inventor and television pioneer
 Melissa Fitzgerald, actress
 William J. Green, III, former mayor of Philadelphia
 Albert M. Greenfield, businessman, political activist, and philanthropist 
 Henry H. Houston, railroad businessman and developer
 W. Thacher Longstreth, former City Councilman At-Large
 Alexander Lawton Mackall, journalist, editor, and gastronomic expert
 David Morse, actor
 George M. Ottinger, artist
 Alec Ounsworth, musician (born 1977)
 Georges Perrier, former resident and celebrity chef, and former owner and chef at Le Bec Fin, and several other restaurants in Philadelphia.
 Christopher Stuart Patterson (born 1842), Dean of the University of Pennsylvania Law School
 Alan Porter, Major League Baseball umpire
 Henry C. Pitz, Illustrator
 Frank Rizzo, former police commissioner of Philadelphia and former mayor of Philadelphia  
 Brian L. Roberts, CEO of Comcast Corporation
 Witold Rybczynski, architect and urban policy scholar
 Hugh Scott, U.S. Congressman and senator
 Denise Scott Brown, architect
 Frederick Winslow Taylor, engineer, management theorist, and consultant
 Marcus Tracy, professional soccer player with Danish club AaB
 Pearl Van Sciver, artist
 Robert Venturi, architect

References

External links

 Chestnut Hill Community Association
 Chestnut Hill Business Association 
 Chestnut Hill College
 Chestnut Hill Historical Society
 The Chestnut Hill Local - newspaper
 Germantown Avenue Parents - family resources and activities
 John Story Jenks School - public school
 Springside Chestnut Hill Academy - independent K-12 school

 
Neighborhoods in Philadelphia
Streetcar suburbs
Historic preservation in the United States
1854 establishments in Pennsylvania
Populated places established in 1704